Matthew Dallow (born 27 January 1972) is a New Zealand bobsledder. He competed in the two man event at the 2006 Winter Olympics.

Dallow is the younger brother of New Zealand television news anchor Simon Dallow.

References

External links
 

1972 births
Living people
New Zealand male bobsledders
Olympic bobsledders of New Zealand
Bobsledders at the 2006 Winter Olympics
Sportspeople from Auckland
Te Arawa people
Ngāti Pikiao people
Ngāti Pūkenga people